Mahmud Khalji (1436–69), also known as Mahmud Khilji and Ala-ud-Din Mahmud Shah I, was the Sultan of Malwa, in what is now the state of Madhya Pradesh, India. Khilji came into power after assassinating Mohammad, the son of the previous ruler, Hoshang Shah, in 1435. He mounted an unsuccessful campaign against the Delhi Sultanate however, it was under his reign that the Malwa Sultanate reached its greatest height.

Battles fought by Mehmud Khalji
 Battle of Mandavgad (1437) - A Battle in which Rana Kumbha defeated and captured Mehmud Khalji.
 Battle of Mandalgarh and Banas (1442-1446) - A series of battles that took place between Mahmud Khalji of Malwa and Rana Kumbha of Mewar. bloodied by these engagements the Sultan did not attack Mewar for another ten years.
Siege of Gagron (February 1444) - Sultan Mahmud besieged Gagron which belonged to Palhan Singh Khichi. Rana Kumbha had sent reinforcements under his commander Dahir, but Dahir died in battle and Palhan was killed by Mehmud's forces while fleeing from the fort.
Battle of Mandalgarh (1457) - Sultan Mahmud attacked Mandalgarh, he sent 7 detachments to attack the Rana from multiple directions. The Malwa forces under Taj Khan and Ali Khan suffered heavy losses in battle against Rana Kumbha after which Mahmud retreated the next morning.
Siege of Mandalgarh (December 1456 - October 1457) - In December Rana Kumbha was forced to move north to confront the sultan of Gujarat, Sultan Mahmud once again attacked Mandalgarh and captured it after a siege.
Siege of Kumbalgarh (1458-9) - Sultan Mahmud besieged Kumbalgarh but finding the fort too strong he retreated back to Mandu.
Battle of Mewar (1467) - Sultan Mahmud invaded Mewar and fought a battle with Rana Kumbha, but retreated after taking heavy losses. This was the last battle fought between the two rivals.

Rule
During rule of Muhammad Shah II of Gujarat Sultanate, Mahmud Khilji invaded Gujarat. After capturing and saving Champaner, he continued his march upon Gujarat at the head of 80,000 horse. Soon, Muhammad Shah II died and was succeeded by Kutb-ud-Din Ahmad Shah II. Mahmud Khilji had laid siege to Sultánpur. Malik Ala-ud-din bin Sohráb, Kutb-ud-dín's commander, surrendered the fort, and was sent with honour to Malwa and appointed governor of Mandu. Mahmud Khilji, marching to Sarsa-Paldi, summoned Bharuch, then commanded by Sídi Marján on behalf of Gujarát Sultanate. The Sidi refused, and fearing delay, the Malwa Sultan after plundering Baroda (now Vadodara) proceeded to Nadiad, whose Bráhmans astonished him by their bravery in killing a mad elephant. Kutb-ud-din Shah now advancing met Sultan Mahmud Khilji at Kapadvanj where, after a doubtful fight of some hours, Kutb-ud-din Shah defeated Sultán Mahmud Khilji. Muzaffar Khán, who is said to have incited the Malwa Sultan Khilji to invade Gujarat, was captured and beheaded, and his head was hung up at the gate of Kapadvanj.

In the same year, Sultan Mahmud Khalji attempted to conquer Nagor then held by Firuz Khan, a cousin of the Gujarat Sultan. Kutb-ud-din Shah despatched an army under the command of Sayad Ataullah, and, as it drew near Sambhar, the Malwa Sultan retired and shortly after Firuz Khan died.

See also
 Vijaya Stambha

References

Kings of Malwa
15th-century Indian Muslims
15th-century Indian monarchs